Rowan Warfe (born 23 June 1976) is a former Australian rules footballer who played for both the Sydney Swans and Fitzroy Football Club in the Australian Football League (AFL).

Warfe, a former Bendigo Under-18s player, made 26 appearances for Fitzroy before moving north to join the Sydney Swans. Plagued by injury, the defender appeared 84 times for the Swans over 8 seasons. He retired in 2004, playing his last game in a one-point win over Hawthorn.

Warfe now plays for Kangaroo Flat in the Bendigo Football League.

External links
 Rowan Warfe Profile

1976 births
Living people
Sydney Swans players
Fitzroy Football Club players
Bendigo Pioneers players
Golden Square Football Club players
Kangaroo Flat Football Club players
Australian rules footballers from Bendigo